Jan Nepomuk Kubíček (1801 in Kingdom of Bohemia – 1880 in Brazil) (in Portuguese: Kubitschek) was one of the great-grandfathers of the former Brazilian president, Juscelino Kubitschek. Kubíček was a Catholic carpenter born in Třeboň (now a town in the Czech Republic). He was among the first group of Czech immigrants to arrive in Brazil (in 1823). Nicknamed as João Alemão ("German John"), Jan Kubíček settled down in Diamantina, Minas Gerais, and became the first patriarch of the Kubitschek family in Brazil.

See also
Czech Brazilians
Immigration to Brazil
Juscelino Kubitschek

References

1801 births
1880 deaths
Brazilian people of Czech descent
Czechoslovak emigrants to Brazil